The Institut National des Sciences Appliquées de Rouen Normandie or INSA Rouen Normandie is a French Grande école, that is to say a five-year curriculum which aims to train highly skilled engineers who possess humane qualities and are well versed in the primary areas of science and engineering. Located in Saint-Étienne-du-Rouvray, on the Madrillet technology center campus, in the suburbs of Rouen, this school accommodates more than 2000 students who specialize in 10 fields.

Departments of engineering

Fine chemistry and engineering
Mathematical engineering 
Mechanical engineering
Industrial and innovative Performance (cooperative training course)
Security processes performance (cooperative training course)
Structures of the information systems
Energetics and propulsion engineering
Energy performance (cooperative training course)
Civil engineering
Industrial and Environmental Risks Management

Other INSA

INSA Lyon
INSA Toulouse
INSA Rennes
INSA Strasbourg

See also
INSA

References

External links
INSA Rouen official website
Architecture of Information Systems website
Mathematical engineering official website

Grandes écoles
Educational institutions established in 1985
1985 establishments in France